Manuel de Sousa Rodrigues (born 29 December 1942) is a former Portuguese footballer who played as a defender.

See also
Football in Portugal

References

External links 
 
 

1942 births
Living people
Portuguese footballers
Association football defenders
Primeira Liga players
C.F. Os Belenenses players
Portugal international footballers